Pancrase: Yes, We Are Hybrid Wrestlers 4 was a mixed martial arts event held by Pancrase Hybrid Wrestling. It took place at Hakata Star Lanes in Hakata, Fukuoka, Japan on December 8, 1993. The main event featured Prancrase co-founder Masakatsu Funaki fighting against Yoshiki Takahashi. Also appearing on the card were Pancrase veterans Ken Shamrock, and co-founder Minoru Suzuki.

Results

See also 
 Pancrase
 List of Pancrase champions
 List of Pancrase events
 1993 in Pancrase

References

External links 
 Sherdog.com event results
 MMA Universe

1993 in mixed martial arts
Mixed martial arts in Japan
Sport in Fukuoka
1993 in Japanese sport
Pancrase events